Garrya fremontii is a species of flowering shrub known by several common names, including California fever bush, bearbrush, and Frémont's silktassel. Both the latter name, and the plant's specific epithet are derived from John C. Frémont.

Distribution
The plant is native to the West coast of the United States, from Washington to California. It can be found in a number of habitats, from mountain forest to woodlands and chaparral canyons and slopes.

Description
Garrya fremontii is a shrub reaching a maximum height of three to four meters. The leaves are oval-shaped, 2 to 12 centimeters long and about half as wide, and smooth green, rarely with hairs on the undersides.

The plant is dioecious, with male and female plants producing long, hanging clusters of yellowish to pinkish flowers.

The fruit is a spherical berry, starting green and turning pink and then purple. The fruit is eaten by birds and mammals, who disperse the seeds.

The plant can also sprout from its root crown. Like many other chaparral species, it is quick to recover from wildfire.

References

External links

Jepson Manual Treatment of Garrya fremontii
USDA Plants Profile for Garrya fremontii
FS.fed.us: Ecology
Garrya fremontii — U.C. Photo gallery

Garryales
Flora of California
Flora of Oregon
Flora of Washington (state)
Flora of the Cascade Range
Flora of the Klamath Mountains
Flora of the Sierra Nevada (United States)
Natural history of the California chaparral and woodlands
Natural history of the California Coast Ranges
Natural history of the Central Valley (California)
Natural history of the Peninsular Ranges
Natural history of the San Francisco Bay Area
John C. Frémont
Taxa named by John Torrey
Flora without expected TNC conservation status